Stockholm East Station or Stockholm Ö is a railway station on the Roslag Railway in Stockholm, Sweden.

The present station was inaugurated in 1932 and located on Valhallavägen in northeastern central Stockholm, close to the Royal Institute of Technology (Tekniska Högskolan), replacing an older provisional station from 1884 which was located some hundred metres to the north. Originally, the building had the offices of SRJ, the company owning and managing the Roslag Railway. There are still offices in the building for the company which is operating the traffic at present.

The building also includes a restaurant, which has the same interior as when the building was new, something which is appreciated by the customers. The restaurant is well known as a place where supporters of sports club Djurgårdens IF like to go, as it is relatively close to the Stockholm Olympic Stadium, the classic former home field of Djurgårdens IF football team.

It is located in conjunction with the Stockholm metro station Tekniska högskolan. It is now the southern end station of the Roslag Railway. Earlier, some trains continued on a tram line to Engelbrektsplan next to Humlegården.

The station makes up the background in the 2011 Swedish movie Stockholm Östra, starring Mikael Persbrandt and Iben Hjejle.

Future

Roslagsbanan is to be diverted to a new terminus at T-Centralen, where all lines of the Stockholm Metro cross, and as such, Stockholms Ö is planned to be closed. Once the extension from the Universitetet station to Odenplan and T-Centralen is built, the stretch of track to Stockholms östra will be dismantled to make way for 500 apartments.

Gallery

References

Railway stations in Stockholm
Rail transport in Stockholm
Railway stations opened in 1884
Buildings and structures completed in 1932